Tirza (minor planet designation: 267 Tirza) is a fairly sizeable, very dark Main belt asteroid.

It was discovered by Auguste Charlois on 27 May 1887 in Nice. It was his first asteroid discovery.

It was named after Tirzah, a woman in the Bible.

References

External links 
The Asteroid Orbital Elements Database
Minor Planet Discovery Circumstances
Asteroid Lightcurve Data File
 
 

000267
Discoveries by Auguste Charlois
Named minor planets
000267
000267
18870527